Dreaming of Words is a 2021 Indian documentary film directed and produced by Nandan. Dreaming of Words has received numerous accolades including National Film Award for Best Educational/Motivational/Instructional Film (2020) awarded to Nandan as both director and producer at the 68th National Film Awards. The documentary traces the life and work of Njattyela Sreedharan, a fourth standard drop-out, who compiles a dictionary connecting four major Dravidian languages.

Synopsis 
Njattyela Sreedharan, a fourth standard drop-out, compiles a dictionary connecting four major Dravidian languages. Travelling across four states and doing extensive research, he spent twenty five years making the multilingual dictionary. This unique dictionary offers a comparative study of Malayalam, Kannada, Tamil and Telugu. Dreaming of Words traces Sreedharan's life, work, love for languages and the struggles to get the dictionary published. The film also explores the linguistic and cultural diversity in India.

People featured 
The documentary follows Njattyela Sreedharan's unparalleled determination to compile his 'Dictionary of Four Dravidian Languages'. 
The film also features P. K. Pokker, former director of Kerala Bhasha Institute, who decided to publish Sreedharan's Tamil - Malayalam dictionary in 2012 and K. P. Mohanan, the secretary of Kerala Sahitya Akademi.

Also featured in the documentary are Seetharam Master, N. P. Usha and K. K. Ramesh.

Release 
Dreaming of Words had its world premiere at the International Mother Language Day Celebrations 2021 organised by the Indira Gandhi National Centre for the Arts and the Ministry of Education (India) in partnership with UNESCO. This was followed by an international premiere as part of Kultura Con at the Brazilian Cultural Center in Angola. 
Dreaming of Words had its American premiere at the Micheaux Film Festival on 26 April 2021. 
The documentary was screened at the annual convention of the Modern Language Association and the annual conference of the Linguistic Society of America in January 2022.

Official selections and screenings

Film festivals 
	Central Florida Film Festival - 2022
	Black Bear Film Festival - USA – 2021
	Kultura Con – Angola – 2 March 2021
	RapidLion: The South African International Film Festival – South Africa – 9 April 2021
	Micheaux Film festival – USA – 26 April 2021 (American premiere)
	61st Kraków Film Festival Video Library – Poland - 30 May 2021 
	Chicago South Asian Film Festival - 2021
	Washington DC South Asian Film Festival – USA - 2021
	Agora Doc Market Thessaloniki Documentary Festival – Greece - 24 June 2021 
	Festival International du Film de Bretagne – France (European premiere) – 8 July 2021
	Festival Nits de cinema oriental de Vic (Asian Summer Film Festival) – Spain – 20 July 2021
	Florida South Asian Film Festival – 2021
	Guangzhou International Documentary Film Festival – China - 2022
	Atlanta Urban Mediamakers Festival – 2021
	Fiorenzo Serra Film festival – Italy – 2021
	Vizantrop Engaged Ethnographic Film Festival – Serbia – 2021
	17th Festival Transterritorial de Cine Underground – Argentina – 2021
	Jaffna International Cinema Festival – Sri Lanka – 2021
	Madurai International Documentary and Short Film Festival – India – 2021
   SiGNS Film Festival - Kerala - 3 April 2022

Academic conferences 
	Annual Convention of the Modern Language Association – 7 January 2022
	Annual Conference of the Linguistics Society of America – 9 January 2022
	28th annual Midwestern Conference on Literature, Language and Media (MCLLM) at Northern Illinois University in DeKalb, Illinois – USA - 2 April 2021 
	14th International Conference of the Asian Association for Lexicography (ASIALEX 2021) – Indonesia – June 2021 
	12th International Indology Graduate Research Symposium (IIGRS 12) organised by the University of Vienna in collaboration with the Austrian Academy of Sciences - Austria – July 2021
	Inter-Asia Cultural Studies Society's conference (IACSS 2021) organised by the Inter-Asia Cultural Studies Society in collaboration with the Cultural Research Centre at National University of Singapore - July 2021 
	World Congress of Applied Linguistics 2021 organised by the International Association of Applied Linguistics at University of Groningen, Netherlands.
   Annual colloquium of La Société d’Histoire et d’Epistémologie des Sciences du Langage (SHESL) 2022 at Institut national des langues et civilisations orientales, Paris - 26 January 2022
   XI Ethnology days and the VIII Finnish Conference on Cultural Policy Research at the University of Jyväskylä, Finland - March 2022
   3rd Asian Conference on Language (ACL2022) organised by The International Academic Forum - Tokyo - 26 March 2022

Other events 
	International Mother Language Day Celebrations organised by The Centre for Linguistics, SLL&CS, Jawaharlal Nehru University, New Delhi - 21 February 2022

Awards 
 National Film Award for Best Educational/Motivational/Instructional Film (2020)
 Kerala State Television Award (2020) for Best Educational Programme
 Festival Prize for Best International Documentary Film at Festival International du Film de Bretagne (2021)
 Audience Award for Best Documentary at the Washington DC South Asian Film Festival (2021)   
 Festival Prize for Best Poster at the Buenos Aires International Film Festival (2021)

See also 
 Multilingualism
 Dravidian Languages
 Lexicography
 Njattyela Sreedharan

References

External links 
 
 Dreaming of Words | Official Trailer on YouTube
 Dreaming of Words | Full Documentary on YouTube

Indian documentary films
2021 documentary films
2021 films
Documentary films about words and language
Documentary films about India
Documentary films about education
Films about lexicography
Films about language
Films shot in Thiruvananthapuram
Films shot in Thrissur
Films shot in Kozhikode
Films shot in Kannur
Films shot in Thalassery
2021 independent films
Biographical documentary films
Works about multilingualism